Ole Christian Bendixen (born 5 August 1947) is a Norwegian sailor. He was born in Trondheim. He competed at the 1972 Summer Olympics in Munich.

References

External links 
 

1947 births
Living people
Sportspeople from Trondheim
Olympic sailors of Norway
Norwegian male sailors (sport)
Sailors at the 1972 Summer Olympics – Flying Dutchman